Bekir Yarangüme (born January 28, 1977) is a Turkish former professional basketball player who last played for Darüşşafaka & Doğuş.

External links
TBLStat.net Profile

1977 births
Living people
Bandırma B.İ.K. players
Beşiktaş men's basketball players
Small forwards
TED Ankara Kolejliler players
Turkish men's basketball players
Türk Telekom B.K. players
Ülker G.S.K. basketball players
People from Aydın